Last of the Whorehouse Piano Players is an album by pianists Ralph Sutton and Jay McShann that was recorded in 1989 and released by the Chiaroscuro label. The album follows the 1980 release of two LPs by Chaz Jazz entitled The Last of the Whorehouse Piano Players: Two Pianos Vol. I & Vol. II which were reissued by Chiaroscuro on CD in 1992 as Last of the Whorehouse Piano Players: The Original Sessions.

Reception

Scott Yanow of AllMusic stated, "Not to be confused with the CD reissue of the same name recorded in 1979, this reunion encounter by pianists Ralph Sutton and Jay McShann is up to the same level of the original dates, with plenty of heated moments  ... While Sutton is the definitive stride pianist of the past half-century, McShann (who also takes a couple of vocals) finds space to infuse the music with a strong dose of blues and Kansas City swing". A seven-minute "Jazzspeak" wraps up the enjoyable outing with some reminiscing about the session".

Track listing
 "Honey" (Seymour Simons, Haven Gillespie, Richard A. Whiting) – 4:46
 "Old Fashioned Love" (James P. Johnson, Cecil Mack) – 6:19
 "'Fore Day Rider" (Walter Brown, Jay McShann) – 3:06
 "On the Sunny Side of the Street" (Jimmy McHugh, Dorothy Fields) – 5:21
 "Sweet Georgia Brown" (Ben Bernie, Maceo Pinkard, Kenneth Casey) – 3:41
 "Doo Wah" (McShann) – 3:49
 "Indiana" (James F. Hanley, Ballard MacDonald) – 3:53
 "'Deed I Do" (Fred Rose, Walter Hirsch) – 4:45
 "Crazy Rhythm" (Irving Caesar, Joseph Meyer, Roger Wolfe Kahn) – 4:15	
 "Cherry" (Don Redman, Ray Gilbert) – 6:17
 "Pretty Baby" (Tony Jackson, Egbert Van Alstyne, Gus Kahn) – 3:50
 "I've Found a New Baby" (Jack Palmer, Spencer Williams) – 3:51	
 Jazzspeak – 6:53

Personnel
Ralph Sutton– piano
Jay McShann – piano, vocals
Milt Hinton – bass
Gus Johnson – drums

References

Ralph Sutton albums
Jay McShann albums
1989 albums
Chiaroscuro Records albums
Albums recorded at Van Gelder Studio